The Norman Depot serves a dual function in the Norman, Oklahoma, community.  As a passenger rail station it is served by Amtrak's Heartland Flyer and as a community center it houses the Norman Performing Arts Studio, a non-profit arts association. The depot is located at milepost 401.8 of the BNSF Railway's Red Rock subdivision.

Community volunteers from the Norman Performing Arts Studio and Passenger Rail Oklahoma serve as "depot hosts" meeting passengers departing on the morning train and those arriving in the evening.  The depot is also available to rent as a meeting space.

History 

The depot was constructed in 1909 by the Atchison, Topeka and Santa Fe Railway.  Its grand opening occurred on November 18, 1909.  It was originally served by trains of its builder, including the Texas Chief.  After Amtrak's establishment in 1971, the Texas Chief continued serving the station. It was renamed the Lone Star in 1974.  Those trains served points as far away as Chicago, Illinois and Galveston, Texas.  Service was discontinued on October 9, 1979, and no passenger train service was available until June 1999, when the Heartland Flyer was instituted between Oklahoma City and Fort Worth, Texas.

The architectural design of the depot is a modified Mission Santa Fe county seat standard plan.

References

External links 

 More Views of Norman Amtrak Station (USA Rail Guide -- Train Web)
 Performing Arts Studio – Norman, OK

Amtrak stations in Oklahoma
Atchison, Topeka and Santa Fe Railway stations
Railway stations in the United States opened in 1909
Railway stations in Oklahoma
Buildings and structures in Norman, Oklahoma
Mission Revival architecture in Oklahoma
Railway stations on the National Register of Historic Places in Oklahoma
National Register of Historic Places in Cleveland County, Oklahoma